
Gmina Pajęczno is an urban-rural gmina (administrative district) in Pajęczno County, Łódź Voivodeship, in central Poland.

Villages
Apart from the town of Pajęczno, Gmina Pajęczno contains the villages and settlements of Barany, Czerkiesy, Dylów A, Dylów Rządowy, Dylów Szlachecki, Janki, Kurzna, Ładzin, Łężce, Lipina, Makowiska, Niwiska Dolne, Niwiska Górne, Nowe Gajęcice, Patrzyków, Podładzin, Podmurowaniec, Siedlec, Stare Gajęcice, Tuszyn, Wręczyca and Wydrzynów.

Neighbouring gminas
Gmina Pajęczno is bordered by the gminas of Działoszyn, Kiełczygłów, Nowa Brzeźnica, Popów, Rząśnia, Siemkowice, Strzelce Wielkie and Sulmierzyce.

References
Polish official population figures 2006

Pajeczno
Pajęczno County